The 1864 United States presidential election in Indiana took place on November 8, 1864, as part of the 1864 United States presidential election. Indiana voters chose 13 representatives, or electors, to the Electoral College, who voted for president and vice president.

Indiana was won by the incumbent President Abraham Lincoln (R-Illinois), running with former Senator and Military Governor of Tennessee Andrew Johnson, with 53.60% of the popular vote, against the 4th Commanding General of the United States Army George B. McClellan (D–New Jersey), running with Representative George H. Pendleton, with 46.40% of the vote.

Results

See also
 United States presidential elections in Indiana

References

Indiana
1864
1864 Indiana elections